Biskupice is a village in the administrative district of Gmina Radłów, within Olesno County, Opole Voivodeship, in south-western Poland.

The village has a population of 435.

References 

Villages in Olesno County